Ortenau-S-Bahn (OSB) is a brand name of the Südwestdeutsche Verkehrs-Aktiengesellschaft (SWEG), a transport company owned by the state of Baden-Württemberg. Between 1998 and 2014, these were operated by Ortenau-S-Bahn GmbH, a wholly-owed subsidiary of SWEG.

Services 
 the Ortenau-S-Bahn branding encompasses the following services, although unlike most German S-Bahn systems they are not designated with an 'S' and the white/green S-Bahn logo:

 – (Acher Valley Railway)
 –– (Rench Valley Railway)
 Offenburg–Appenweier–– (Appenweier–Strasbourg railway)
 Offenburg–– (Black Forest Railway)
 Offenburg–Hausach–– (Kinzig Valley Railway)
 – (Harmersbach Valley Railway)

References

External links 
 
 Official web site of the Ortenau S-Bahn

Freudenstadt (district)
Ortenaukreis
Railway companies of Germany
Rottweil (district)
Ortenau
Rapid transit in Germany